James W. Silver (June 28, 1907 – July 25, 1988) was a historian, writer of Mississippi: The Closed Society, and professor at the University of Mississippi and later at the University of Notre Dame and the University of South Florida.

When rioting erupted on the Ole Miss campus after James Meredith became the University of Mississippi's first African-American student and federal troops moved in to keep order, Silver befriended Meredith. In a speech to the Southern Historical Association in the Fall of 1963, he analyzed the violence with which Mississippi was resisting desegregation. Mississippi was, he said, "a closed society" -- "totalitarian," "monolithic," "corrupt." The speech received widespread media coverage, and he expanded his analysis in a book, Mississippi: The Closed Society (1964). His advocacy of racial change had subjected him to hostility in Mississippi and even an attempt by the Mississippi State Sovereignty Commission to have him fired. That effort failed, but  Silver took a job teaching at University of Notre Dame in Indiana.

He taught at Notre Dame from 1965 until 1969. He left Notre Dame to teach history at the University of South Florida until he retired in 1982.

Notes

External links
 "Another Mississippi book that made a difference", Carol Polsgrove on Writers' Lives.

1907 births
1988 deaths
American anti-racism activists
20th-century American historians
American male non-fiction writers
20th-century American male writers